The Masked Saint is a 2015 Canadian biographical drama film directed by Warren P. Sonoda. It is based on the 2009 book of the same name by Chris Whaley. The film stars Brett Granstaff, Lara Jean Chorostecki, T.J. McGibbon, Diahann Carroll (in her final film role before her death in October 2019), Roddy Piper, and James Preston Rogers. It was produced by Cliff McDowell and released in select theaters on January 8, 2016.

Plot
Chris Samuels is a former professional wrestler who retires from the ring to settle down as a small town pastor. When the pastor witnesses rampant problems in the community, he decides to moonlight as a masked vigilante fighting the injustice. While facing crises at home and at the church, the pastor must evade the police and somehow reconcile his secret, violent identity with his calling as a pastor.

Cast
 Brett Granstaff as Chris Samuels
 Lara Jean Chorostecki as Michelle
 T.J. McGibbon as Carrie Samuels
 Diahann Carroll as Ms. Edna
 Roddy Piper as Nicky Stone
 James Preston Rogers as The Reaper
 Mykel Shannon Jenkins as Detective Harper
 Patrick McKenna as Judd Lumpkin
 Scott Nichol as Tim McDonald
 Joan Gregson as Mrs. Beasley

Reception
The Masked Saint received negative reviews from critics. On Rotten Tomatoes, the film holds a rating of 14%, based on 7 reviews, with an average rating of 4.1/10. On Metacritic, the film has a score of 22 out of 100, based on 5 critics, indicating "generally unfavorable reviews".

References

External links
 
 
 
 

2015 films
2015 biographical drama films
Canadian biographical drama films
Canadian independent films
English-language Canadian films
Films about religion
Films shot in Sault Ste. Marie, Ontario
2015 independent films
2015 drama films
Films directed by Warren P. Sonoda
2010s English-language films
2010s Canadian films